Philip Lee Tau Sang (d. 1959) was a politician of Hakka Chinese descent in North Borneo (now the east Malaysian state of Sabah). At various different times, he was a member of the Advisory Council of North Borneo (1947–1950), the Legislative Council of North Borneo (1950–1958) and the Executive Council of North Borneo (1950–1953, 1956–1957).

He was highly respected by the Chinese community in North Borneo and well-liked by the British colonists. The latter touted him as a potential future Chief Minister of North Borneo after its independence from the United Kingdom. However, four years before North Borneo joined the federation of Malaysia, Lee suddenly died of a heart attack in the United States.

Lee Tau Sang Road (Malay: Jalan Lee Tau Sang) is named in Lee's honour. It is located in Tanjung Aru, a southern suburb of Kota Kinabalu, the state capital of Sabah.

1959 deaths
Malaysian people of Hakka descent
People from Sabah
Malaysian politicians
Year of birth uncertain